The 1994 Internationaux de Strasbourg was a women's tennis tournament played on outdoor clay courts in Strasbourg, France that was part of Tier III of the 1994 WTA Tour. It was the eighth edition of the tournament and was held from 16 May until 22 May 1994. Third-seeded Mary Joe Fernández won the singles title and earned $25,000 first-prize money.

Finals

Singles
 Mary Joe Fernández defeated  Gabriela Sabatini 2–6, 6–4, 6–0
 It was Fernández's 1st title of the year and the 4th of her career.

Doubles
 Lori McNeil /  Rennae Stubbs defeated  Patricia Tarabini /  Caroline Vis 6–3, 3–6, 6–2

References

External links
 ITF tournament edition details 
 Tournament draws

Internationaux de Strasbourg
1994
Internationaux de Strasbourg
May 1994 sports events in Europe